The Short Springbok was a two-seat, all-metal reconnaissance biplane produced for the British Air Ministry in the 1920s. All together six aircraft of the Springbok design were built but none entered service with the armed forces.

Design
The Springbok fuselage was of streamlined monocoque construction mounted onto the lower wing and almost filling the gap between the upper and lower wings. The wings were single-bay, of unequal span and unequal chord, constructed of steel spars with an aluminum (S.3/3a Springbok) / fabric covering (S.3b Chamois). The ailerons were on the upper wing only. The crew of two sat in tandem open cockpits, with a cutout in the upper mainplane for the pilot's head; the observer/gunner sat behind the pilot, just behind the upper wing. The tail unit comprised a braced monoplane tail near the fuselage top with a single fin and rudder. The undercarriage was of the cross-axle type, situated under the nose and complemented by a tailskid at the rear.

History
The Springbok traces its history from the pioneering, all-metal Short Silver Streak, which was exhibited at the Olympia Aero Show in 1920. The Air Ministry had purchased the Silver Streak and subjected it to structural tests for two years at R.A.E., Farnborough. When in due course the Air Ministry issued a "Bristol Fighter-replacement" Specification 19/21, Short Brothers contracted to deliver two S.3 Springbok I two-seat reconnaissance biplanes (J6974 and J6975). On 30 November 1923, the second of the two prototypes, J6975, crashed near Martlesham when it spun in shortly after takeoff, killing the pilot. The cause was diagnosed as rudder blanking during spinning and a new wing design was prepared for the Springbok Mk. II, of which six examples – later reduced to three – were ordered in 1924.

Powered by a 400 hp Bristol Jupiter IV radial engine, the S.3 Springbok I was an all-metal aircraft, with a duralumin monocoque fuselage and two-bay, equal-span wings. The strength/weight factor of the mainplanes was disappointing and the Air Ministry ordered three more Springboks with lighter, fabric-covered wings attached directly to the lower fuselage and a redesigned tail assembly. The first of these S.3a Springbok IIs (numbered J7925-J7927) was flown by Shorts' Chief Test Pilot J. Lankester Parker at the Isle of Grain on 25 March 1925.

The S.3b Chamois was produced in response to Specification 30/24 (as was the Vickers Vespa). The airframe of the first Springbok II (J7295) was adapted to take the more powerful 450 hp Jupiter VI. Its first flight took place at Lympne Aerodrome on 14 March 1927, also flown by Lankester Parker.

The tests, from 27 April 1927 by Aeroplane and Armament Experimental Establishment (A&AEE), then at Martlesham Heath, determined that its performance was disappointing and the only prototype was scrapped.

Operators
 
 Aeroplane and Armament Experimental Establishment (A&AEE)

Specifications (Springbok I)

See also

References

External links

1920s British military reconnaissance aircraft
Short Brothers aircraft
Biplanes
Single-engined tractor aircraft
Aircraft first flown in 1923